George Herbert Locke (March 29, 1870 – January 28, 1937) was a Canadian librarian. He was chief librarian of the Toronto Public Library from 1908 until his death, a time of great expansion in that library system. In 1926-27 he became the second Canadian to be president of the American Library Association.  The George H. Locke Memorial Branch of the Toronto Public Library, which opened in 1949, is named after him.

Biography
Locke was born in Beamsville, Ontario, on March 29, 1870, and was educated at Ryerson Public School in Toronto, Brampton High School, and Collingwood Collegiate Institute. He studied at Victoria University, and graduated from the University of Toronto in 1893. After graduating, he taught as a professor of ancient history at the University of Toronto and continued to teach at other colleges in subsequent years. He served as editor of the School Review while at the University of Chicago and was also the author of books on Canadian history. He was a member of the Arts and Letters Club of Toronto, and served as president from 1910–1912. He was survived by his wife Grace Moore Locke.

In 1930, Locke, along with Mary J. L. Black and John Ridington, were hired as part of a commission of inquiry into the conditions of Canadian public libraries. As part of the commission, Locke and the other commissioners toured Canada to visit and report on local libraries. The commission concluded in 1933 with the publication of Libraries in Canada: A Study of Library Conditions and Needs.

He died on January 28, 1937, in Toronto.

Bibliography
Builders of the Canadian Commonwealth. 1923.
The education of a people : the inaugural lecture delivered at Macdonald College. 1908.
English History (ALA: Reading with a purpose). 1930.
Libraries in Canada : a study of library conditions and needs. 1933.
When Canada Was New France. 1919.

References

Further reading
 Bruce, Lorne D. (2020).  George Herbert Locke and the Transformation of Toronto Public Library, 1908–1937.  (Waterloo, ON: Lorne D. Bruce).

External links
 Biography of George H. Locke at Ex Libris Association

 

1870 births
1937 deaths
Canadian librarians
University of Toronto alumni
People from the Regional Municipality of Niagara
People from Toronto
Persons of National Historic Significance (Canada)
Presidents of the American Library Association